Yilan is a railway station of Yilan line of the Taiwan Railways Administration located at Yilan City, Yilan County, Taiwan.

History 
The station was opened on 24 March 1919.

On 21 October 2018, a train derailment occurred, killing 18 people and injuring 187.

Structure 
There are one island platform and one side platform.

Around the Station 
 Beneficial Microbes Museum and Tourism Factory
 Former Yilan Prison
 Memorial Hall of Founding of Yilan Administration
 Taiwan Theater Museum
 Yilan Brick Kiln
 Yilan County Council
 Yilan County Government
 Yilan Distillery Chia Chi Lan Wine Museum
 Yilan Museum of Art

See also
 List of railway stations in Taiwan

References

External links 

Yilan Station 

1919 establishments in Taiwan
Railway stations in Yilan County, Taiwan
Railway stations opened in 1919
Railway stations served by Taiwan Railways Administration